David Bowie (1947–2016) held leading roles in several feature films, including The Man Who Fell to Earth (1976) (for which he won a Saturn Award for Best Actor), Just a Gigolo (1978), Merry Christmas, Mr. Lawrence (1983), The Hunger (1983), Labyrinth (1986), and The Linguini Incident (1991). 
Films in which he appeared in a supporting role or cameo include The Last Temptation of Christ (1988) and Zoolander (2001).

Bowie also appeared on several television series including Extras, Dream On, and the horror anthology series  The Hunger. He won a Daytime Emmy Award in the category of Outstanding Special Class Special in 2003 for Hollywood Rocks the Movies: The 1970s with David Bowie (AMC).

Bowie was featured in a number of documentaries, films, and videos focusing on his career. He also appeared frequently in documentaries about other musicians.

Film

As actor

As subject of documentary or video 
This list contains documentaries and videos that have been officially released as films, television broadcasts and/or home video, ordered by date filmed. Bootlegs and privately distributed videos are not included. The list is selective, particularly with respect to television performances and interviews. A more complete list can be found in Nicholas Pegg's The Complete David Bowie (Titan, 2004, revised and updated 2011).

As himself in other documentaries 
This list is selective. For a more complete list, see Nicholas Pegg's The Complete David Bowie.

 Group Madness: The Making of Yellowbeard (1983)
 Cool Cats: Twenty-Five Years of Rock 'N' Roll Style (1983)
 Queen: The Magic Years (1987)
 Imagine: John Lennon (1988)
 Superstar: The Life and Times of Andy Warhol (1990)
 Travelling Light (1992)
 The Time Life History Of Rock N' Roll (1995)
 Inspirations (1997)
 Lou Reed: Rock and Roll Heart (1998)
 Mayor of the Sunset Strip (2003)
 Scott Walker: 30 Century Man (2006)

As producer 
 Büvös vadász (1994) (aka Magic Hunter)
 Passaggio per il paradiso (1998) (aka Gentle Into the Night or Passage to Paradise)
 Scott Walker: 30 Century Man (2006)

See also 

 David Bowie videography - Bowie's appearances in music-related film.

References 

Filmography
Bowie, David

it:Filmografia di David Bowie